Thai studies, a branch of Asian studies, is the multidisciplinary study of Thailand and the Thai peoples. It calls upon the academic disciplines of history, anthropology, religious studies, political science, Thai language, Thai literature, musicology and the physical sciences such as geology.

The first organisation to sponsor and promote Thai Studies was the Siam Society, established in 1904. The Siam Society and the affiliated Siamese Heritage Protection Trust maintain an extensive library of Thai studies materials and exhibits.

The Journal of the Siam Society (JSS) is a peer-reviewed academic journal. Open access to PDF copies of all issues back to 1904 is available online.

The Center for Thai Studies at Chulalongkorn University is a Thai studies center. The Thailand Information Center (TIC) at Chulalongkorn's main library maintains a repository of research materials for Thai studies.

Cornell University was the first active center for Thai studies in the United States. In 1947, Lauriston Sharp began the Cornell-Thailand Project, an initiative to collate baseline data in a comprehensive study of what was then a farming village on the outskirts of Bangkok, now Tambon Bang Chan in Bangkok's Khlong Sam Wa District. 

Outside Thailand, a group of young, active academics at the Royal Melbourne Institute of Technology (RMIT) promoted Thai studies as a research discipline in social studies. The inaugural open-access Thai Studies Journal was launched at RMIT in 2011. RMIT hosted three Thai studies conferences in 2001, 2011, and 2014.

References

External links
 The Thai Language at Cornell University
 The Siam Society
 The 10th International Conference on Thai Studies
 The Thai Studies Center, Chulalongkorn University
 Thailand Information Center, Chulalongkorn University
 Thai Khadi Research Institute, Thammasat University
 thaistudies.net, An international forum for students of Thailand based at Northern Illinois University
 Thai Studies at the University of Wisconsin
 National Thai Studies Centre, located at the College of Asia and the Pacific in the Australian National University
 The International Journal of Studies in Thai Business, Society & Culture hosted by the School of Management, RMIT University, Australia

 
Southeast Asian studies
Thai culture